Kondotty Taluk, otherwise called Western Eranad Taluk, comes under Tirur revenue division in Malappuram district of Kerala, India. Its headquarters is the town of Kondotty. Kondotty Taluk contains Kondotty municipality and a few Gram panchayats.

History
Kondotty Taluk was declared as the seventh taluk in Malappuram district by chief minister Oommen Chandy on 23 December 2013. It was formed by carving the villages included in the erstwhile Kondotty Revenue block out of Eranad and Tirurangadi Taluks.

Villages 
Kondotty Taluk comprises 12 villages (sub-divisions):

Vazhakkad
Vazhayur
Cherukavu
Pulikkal
Kondotty
Muthuvallur
Pallikkal
Chelembra
 Cheekkode
Nediyiruppu
Morayur
Kuzhimanna

Taluks of Malappuram

See also 
 List of villages in Malappuram district
 List of Gram Panchayats in Malappuram district
 List of desoms in Malappuram district (1981)
 Revenue Divisions of Kerala

References

Sources 

Taluks of Kerala
Geography of Malappuram district